William Pole (1814–1900) was an English engineer, astronomer, musician and authority on whist.

William Pole  may also refer to:
Sir William Pole (antiquary) (1561–1635), historian of Devon
William Pole (died 1587) (1515–1587), MP for Lyme Regis, father of William Pole (antiquary)
Sir William Pole, 4th Baronet (1678–1741), English landowner and politician

See also
William de la Pole (disambiguation)
William Pole-Carew, Cornish politician
William Pole-Tylney-Long-Wellesley (disambiguation)
William Pool, English inventor and whitesmith